Haacke's rock gecko or Haacke's flat gecko (Afroedura haackei) is a species of African gecko endemic to South Africa.

References

Afroedura
Endemic reptiles of South Africa
Reptiles described in 1984